Ubiretama is a municipality of the western part of the state of Rio Grande do Sul, Brazil. The name comes from the Tupi language. It is located 499 km west of the state capital of Porto Alegre, northeast of Alegrete and east of Argentina. The population is 1,983 (2020 est.) in an area of 126.69 km2.

Bounding municipalities

Santa Rosa
Senador Salgado Filho
Guarani das Missões
Cerro Largo
Campina das Missões
Cândido Godói

References

External links
https://web.archive.org/web/20070927224137/http://www.citybrazil.com.br/rs/ubiretama/ 

Municipalities in Rio Grande do Sul